A Choquet integral is a subadditive or superadditive integral created by the French mathematician Gustave Choquet in 1953. It was initially used in statistical mechanics and potential theory, but found its way into decision theory in the 1980s, where it is used as a way of measuring the expected utility of an uncertain event.  It is applied specifically to membership functions and capacities. In imprecise probability theory, the Choquet integral is also used to calculate the lower expectation induced by a 2-monotone lower probability, or the upper expectation induced by a 2-alternating upper probability.

Using the Choquet integral to denote the expected utility of belief functions measured with capacities is a way to reconcile the Ellsberg paradox and the Allais paradox.

Definition
The following notation is used:

  – a set.
  – a function.
  – a monotone set function.

where the integrals on the right-hand side are the usual Riemann integral (the integrands are integrable because they are monotone in ).

Properties

In general the Choquet integral does not satisfy additivity. More specifically, if  is not a probability measure, it may hold that

The Choquet integral does satisfy the following properties.

Monotonicity
If  then

Positive homogeneity

For all  it holds that

Comonotone additivity

If  are comonotone functions, that is, if for all  it holds that
.

then

Subadditivity

If  is 2-alternating, then

Superadditivity

If  is 2-monotone, then

Alternative representation
Let  denote a cumulative distribution function such that  is  integrable. Then this following formula is often referred to as Choquet Integral:

where .
 choose  to get ,
 choose  to get

Applications 
The Choquet integral was applied in image processing, video processing and computer vision. In behavioral decision theory, Amos Tversky and Daniel Kahneman use the Choquet integral and related methods in their formulation of cumulative prospect theory.

See also
 Nonlinear expectation
 Superadditivity
 Subadditivity

Notes

Further reading

Expected utility
Functional analysis
Definitions of mathematical integration